Timofey Nastyukhin (Russian: Тимофей Настюхин; born on November 24, 1989), is a Russian mixed martial artist. He is a former FILA Pankration world champion. He made his MMA debut in 2010 and currently competes in ONE Championship.

Background 
Nastyukhin was born in the Soviet Kazakhstan, but after the fall of the Soviet Union, his family moved to Siberia. He was bullied for his Kazakh heritage and took up martial arts as a way to combat bullying he received. Nastyukhin found success in Pankration where he became a four-time national champion and a two-time European champion.

Nastyukhin's success in Pankration made the transition to mixed martial arts seamless.

Mixed martial arts career 
Nastyukhin made his MMA debut on April 26, 2010, at Siberian League: Siberia vs. Ural. He lost via rear-naked choke to Magomed Guseinov. Nastyukhin was only 18-years-old at the time of his debut, and after the loss he took nearly three years away from active competition to improve his skill set.

On April 8, 2013, Nastyukhin returned to action and began a seven-fight win streak that would lead to his signing to ONE Championship against Dmitry Ermolaev at Siberian League: Siberia vs. Kazakhstan. He won via triangle choke in the first round.

ONE Championship
On December 5, 2014, Nastyukhin debuted in ONE Championship against Eduard Folayang. He made an instant impact with a first-round knockout by way of a flying knee and soccer kicks in the first round.

At ONE: Defending Honor on November 11, 2016, Nastyukhin squared off against Kotetsu Boku. During the first round, Nastyukhin broke his leg. Although he was able to finish the round, a ringside physician called a stop to the bout. Nastyukhin would not return until August 2017.

In the opening round of the ONE Championship Lightweight World Grand Prix on March 31, 2019, Nastyukhin was matched up with the debuting Eddie Alvarez. Alvarez, a former Bellator and UFC lightweight world champion, was seeking another major championship. Nastyukhin stunned the world with a first-round TKO over Alvarez. However, due to injury, Nastyukhin would not be able to advance to the next round and compete in the semi-finals.

On November 6, 2020, Nastyukhin returned to action and faced #3-ranked lightweight Pieter Buist at ONE Championship: Inside the Matrix 2 in a ONE lightweight title eliminator. He won the fight by unanimous decision and secured a title shot against ONE Lightweight World Champion Christian Lee.

Nastyukhin's title shot materialized against Christian Lee at ONE on TNT 2 on April 14, 2021. He lost the fight via TKO in the first round.

Nastyukhin faced Saygid Guseyn Arslanaliev in a rematch at ONE: Winter Warriors on December 3, 2021. He lost the bout via TKO in the third round. The contest with Arslanaliev was later named 2021 Fight of the Year by ONE Championship.

Nastyukhin faced Halil Amir at ONE on Prime Video 2 on September 30, 2022. He lost the bout via TKO stoppage at the beginning of the second round.

Championships and accomplishments
ONE Championship 
MMA Fight of the Year 2021 
Performance of the Night (One time)
Fastest knockout in ONE Championship (0:06)

Mixed martial arts record 

|-
|Loss
|align=center|14–7
|Halil Amir
| TKO (punches)
|ONE on Prime Video 2
|
|align=center|2
|align=center|0:58
|Kallang, Singapore
|
|-
|Loss
|align=center|14–6
| Saygid Guseyn Arslanaliev	
| TKO (punches)
|ONE: Winter Warriors
|
|align=center|3
|align=center|0:49 
|Kallang, Singapore
|  
|-
| Loss
| align=center|14–5
| Christian Lee
| TKO (punches)
| ONE on TNT 2
| 
| align=center|1
| align=center|1:13
| Kallang, Singapore
| 
|-
|Win
|align=center|14–4
|Pieter Buist
|Decision (unanimous)
|ONE Championship: Inside the Matrix 2
||
|align=center|3
|align=center|5:00
|Kallang, Singapore
|
|-
|-
|Win
|align=center|13–4
|Eddie Alvarez
|TKO (punches)
|ONE Championship: A New Era
||
|align=center|1
|align=center|4:05
|Tokyo, Japan
| 
|-
|-
|Loss
|align=center|12–4
|Saygid Guseyn Arslanaliev
|KO (punches)
|ONE Championship: Conquest of Heroes
||
|align=center|1
|align=center|1:57
|Jakarta, Indonesia
|
|-
|-
|Win
|align=center|12–3
|Amir Khan
|Decision (unanimous)
|ONE Championship: Quest for Gold
||
|align=center|3
|align=center|5:00
|Yangon, Myanmar
|  
|-
|-
|Win
|align=center|11–3
|Koji Ando
|Decision (unanimous)
|ONE Championship: Kings & Conquerors
||
|align=center|3
|align=center|5:00
|Macau, China
|
|-
|-
|Loss
|align=center|10–3
|Kotetsu Boku
|TKO (doctor stoppage)
|ONE Championship: Defending Honor
||
|align=center|1
|align=center|5:00
|Kallang, Singapore
|
|-
|-
|Win
|align=center|10–2
|Rob Lisita
|KO (punch and soccer kick)
|ONE Championship: Kingdom of Champions
||
|align=center|1
|align=center|0:06
|Bangkok, Thailand
|
|-
|-
|Loss
|align=center|9–2
|Herbert Burns
|Submission (rear-naked choke)
|ONE Championship: Odyssey of Champions
||
|align=center|1
|align=center|3:26
|Jakarta, Indonesia
|
|-
|-
|Win
|align=center|9–1
|Yusuke Kawanago
|TKO (soccer kicks)
|ONE Championship: Dynasty of Champions 2
||
|align=center|1
|align=center|1:32
|Guangzhou, Guangdong, China
| 
|-
|Win
|align=center|8–1
|Eduard Folayang
|KO (flying knee and soccer kicks)
|ONE Championship: Warrior's Way
|
|align=center|1
|align=center|3:11
|Manila, Philippines
|
|-
|Win
|align=center|7–1
|Sayd-Hamzat Avkhadov
|KO (punch)
|Absolute Championship Berkut: Grand Prix Berkut 9
|
|align=center|1
|align=center|0:54
|Grozny, Russia
|
|-
|Win
|align=center|6–1
|Mairbek Makhanov
|KO (punch)
|Siberian League: Combat Kuzbass 2
|
|align=center|1
|align=center|0:20
|Novokuznetsk, Russia
|
|-
|Win
|align=center|5–1
|Nikolay Romanschikov
|Submission (triangle choke)
|Altay Republik MMA League: Throwdown
|
|align=center|1
|align=center|0:46
|Gorno-Altaysk, Russia
|
|-
|Win
|align=center|4–1
|Shamil Rafikov
|Submission (triangle choke)
|Eurasian Fighting Championship: Siberian Challenge
|
|align=center|1
|align=center|3:52
|Barnaul, Russia
|
|-
|Win
|align=center|3–1
|Levon Oganyan
|TKO (punches)
|Russian MMA Union: 2013 Russian MMA Super Cup
|
|align=center|1
|align=center|3:10
|Kemerovo, Russia
|
|-
|Win
|align=center|2–1
|Alexander Vasiliev
|Submission (rear-naked choke)
|White Rex: Warrior Spirit
|
|align=center|1
|align=center|0:33
|Novosibirsk, Russia
|
|-
|Win
|align=center|1–1
|Dmitry Yermolaev
|Submission (triangle choke)
|Siberian League: Siberia vs. Kazakhstan
|
|align=center|1
|align=center|1:30
|Novokuznetsk, Russia
|
|-
|Loss
|align=center|0–1
|Magomedsaigi Guseinov
|Submission (rear-naked choke)
|Siberian League: Siberia vs. Ural
|
|align=center|1
|align=center|5:46
|Novokuznetsk, Russia
|
|-

See also 

 List of current ONE fighters

References

External links 
 Profile at ONE Championship

1989 births
Living people
Russian male mixed martial artists
Lightweight mixed martial artists
Mixed martial artists utilizing pankration
Russian people of Kazakhstani descent